Netai Bysack (21 March 1921 – 5 December 2005) was an Indian cyclist. He competed in four events  at the 1952 Summer Olympics.  He also represented India in the 1948 Olympics and the 1951 Asian Games.

References

External links
 

1921 births
2005 deaths
Sportspeople from Kolkata
Indian male cyclists
Olympic cyclists of India
Cyclists at the 1952 Summer Olympics
Asian Games medalists in cycling
Cyclists at the 1951 Asian Games
Medalists at the 1951 Asian Games
Asian Games bronze medalists for India